Bon-y-maen (until 2022 Bonymaen) is the name of an electoral ward in the City and County of Swansea, Wales, UK.

The ward is bounded by Neath Port Talbot county borough to the east and the Swansea wards of Llansamlet and Morriston to the north; St. Thomas to the south; and Landore to the west.

For the purposes of elections Bon-y-maen is divided into several polling districts: Winch Wen, Pentre Dwr, Hanover Square and Pentrechwyth.  Bon-y-maen returns 2 councillors to the local council.  The current councillors are Mandy Evans and Paul Lloyd (both Labour Party).

The electoral ward consists of some or all of the following areas: Bon-y-maen, Cefn Hengoed, Copper Quarter, Crymlyn Bog, Morfa, Pentrechwyth, Pentre Dwr, Winch Wen, in the parliamentary constituency of Swansea East.

Election results

2017 Swansea Council election

2012 Swansea Council election

2008 Swansea Council election

2004 Swansea Council election

1999 Swansea Council election
At a by-election an Independent candidate captured the seat from Labour and held it at the next election in 1999.

1995 Swansea Council election
The first election to the new unitary City and County of Swansea Council took place in 1995. Both seats were won by Labour.

References

 Bonymaen (electoral ward)
Swansea electoral wards